"Innocent" is a single by British rock band Stereophonics which was released on 9 November 2009. It was the first single taken from their seventh studio album, Keep Calm and Carry On, which was released a week later, on 16 November 2009. It was also the band's first single for Mercury Records.

Track listings

 Note: The physical CD and vinyl formats were subsequently cancelled.

Music video
The music video for "Innocent" premiered on the group's YouTube account on 5 October 2009.

Personnel

Stereophonics
 Kelly Jones – lead vocalist, guitar
 Richard Jones – bass
 Adam Zindani – guitar, backing vocals
 Javier Weyler – drums

Additional
 Niel Cowley – piano, Wurlitzer, organ
 Jim Abbiss – piano

Technical personnel
 Production – Kelly Jones, Jim Abbiss
 Mixing – Barny Barnicott
 Additional mixing – Jim Lowe
 Engineering – Jonathan Shakhovskoy
 Additional Engineering – Tom Hough, Helen Atkinson, Ian Sherwin
 Mastering – John Davis

Charts

References

External links
 Official web site

2009 singles
Stereophonics songs
Songs written by Kelly Jones
2009 songs
Mercury Records singles